The Turkeyfoot Valley Area School District is a small, rural school district located in the Southwestern portion of Somerset County, Pennsylvania. The school district serves the municipalities of Addison, Addison Township, Confluence, Lower Turkeyfoot Township and Ursina. It encompasses approximately 102 square miles. According to 2000 federal census data, it serves a resident population of 3,093. As of 2009, the per capita income was $14,042 while the
median family income was $31,825.

School District History 
In 1950, the jointure of the Addison Borough, Addison Township, Confluence Borough, Lower Turkeyfoot Township and Ursina Borough school districts were formed to create the Turkeyfoot Valley Area School District.TVASD History Page

Schools 
All students attend school in one building, which is called Turkeyfoot Valley Area School, located on State Route 523 in the village of Harnedsville. This Structure was built in 1956 and only housed grades 7-12 at the time, the 1956  brick, concrete and steel building was $658,584.22. In 1967, the new elementary building was added to the high school. The cost of construction was $864,876.22. The campus was renovated in 1996.

Grade Levels

Extracurriculars
The district offers a variety of clubs, activities and sports.

Sports

References 

1. National Data 
2.Turkeyfoot Valley Area School District Website
3.Pennsylvania Interscholastic Athletic Information

School districts established in 1950
School districts in Somerset County, Pennsylvania
1950 establishments in Pennsylvania